Chamaecallis is a genus of flowering plants belonging to the family Rosaceae.

Its native range is Himalaya to Southern Central China.

Species:
 Chamaecallis perpusilloides (W.W.Sm.) Smedmark

References

Rosaceae
Rosaceae genera